The Cycledrome was an American football stadium and velodrome located in Providence, Rhode Island.  Its name derived from its intended use as a bicycle racing stadium (velodrome) when it was built in 1925 by sports promoter Pete Laudati. The stadium was home to the Providence Steam Roller of the National Football League (NFL) from 1925 to 1933, who played their games in the infield of the velodrome. The football field was snugly surrounded by a wooden track with steeply-banked ends, which cut sharply into the end zones and reduced them to just five yards in depth. During football games, temporary seating was permitted on the straight-away portion of the track, which was so close to the field that players, after being tackled, often found themselves in the stands.

In 1930 floodlights were installed at the stadium for night games, and the Steam Roller became the first NFL team to host a game under lights.

The Cycledrome had a capacity of 10,000 spectators.

The Cycledrome was located off North Main Street, near the Providence-Pawtucket line. In its later years, the Cycledrome was the location of the E.M. Loewe's drive-in theater. The site is now home to an Ocean State Job Lot and a Peter Pan Bus Terminal.

Notes

References

Defunct college football venues
Defunct National Football League venues
Providence Friars football
Providence Steam Roller
American football venues in Rhode Island
Soccer venues in Rhode Island
Defunct sports venues in Rhode Island
Demolished sports venues in the United States
Velodromes in the United States
Buildings and structures in Providence, Rhode Island
Sports venues demolished in 1938
Sports venues completed in 1925
1925 establishments in Rhode Island
1937 disestablishments in Rhode Island